Alexandr Sergeevich Mishchenko (born August 18, 1941 in Rostov-on-Don) is a Russian mathematician, specializing in differential geometry and topology and their applications to mathematical modeling in the biosciences.

Education and career
After completing undergraduate study in 1965 in the Faculty of Mechanics and Mathematics of Moscow State University, Mishchenko became a graduate student in the Department of Higher Geometry and Topology of the same Faculty and graduated there in 1968 with Candidate of Sciences degree (PhD). His PhD thesis K-теория на категории бесконечных комплексов (K-theory on the category of infinite complexes) was supervised by Sergei Novikov. In 1973 Mishchenko received his Russian Doctor of Sciences degree (habilitation) with thesis Гомотопические инварианты неодносвязных многообразий (Homotopy invariants of non-simply connected varieties).

Mishchenko is since 1979 a full professor in the Department of Higher Geometry and Topology, Faculty of Mechanics and Mathematics, Moscow State University. He also works at the Steklov Institute of Mathematics. His research deals with geometry and topology, application of algebraic and functional methods in the theory of smooth varieties with non-commutative geometry and topology, and applications of geometry and topology to mathematical modeling in ecology, molecular biology, bioinformatics. He has done some research on the history of mathematics, mathematical education, and the history of teaching mathematics. He is the author or coauthor of over 100 research articles.

In 1970 he was an Invited Speaker at the International Congress of Mathematicians in Nice. In 1971 he was awarded, jointly with Victor Buchstaber, the  Moscow Mathematical Society Prize for research on the K-theory of infinite-dimensional CW-complexes. In 1996 Mischenko, jointly with Anatoly Fomenko, was awarded the State Prize of the Russian Federation in the field of science and technology for a series of works involving investigation of invariants of smooth manifolds and Hamiltonian dynamical systems. In 2006 Mishchenko was awarded the title of Honored Professor of Moscow State University.

Selected publications

Articles
 
  Izv. Akad. Nauk SSSR Ser. Mat. 38, 81–106 (1974)

Books
 with coauthors: 
 with coauthors: 
 with coauthors: 
 with coauthors: 
 with coauthors:

References

 

1941 births
Living people
Moscow State University alumni
Academic staff of Moscow State University
20th-century Russian mathematicians
21st-century Russian mathematicians
Differential geometers
Topologists